

Hermann Hohn (11 October 1897 – 13 November 1968) was a German general in the Wehrmacht of Nazi Germany during World War II, who commanded several divisions. He was a recipient of the Knight's Cross of the Iron Cross with Oak Leaves and Swords.

Hohn was released in 1948 and settled in Ladenburg. From 1953 to 1965 he was mayor of Ladenburg.

Awards
 Iron Cross (1914) 2nd Class (31 October 1917) & 1st Class (March 1919)
 Iron Cross (1939) 2nd Class (26 June 1940) & 1st Class (23 July 1941)
 German Cross in Gold on 17 April 1943 as Oberst in Grenadier-Regiment 105
 Knight's Cross of the Iron Cross with Oak Leaves and Swords
 Knight's Cross on 28 November 1943 as Oberst and deputy leader of the 72. Infanterie-Division
 410th Oak Leaves on 1 March 1944 as Oberst and leader of the 72. Infanterie-Division
 109th Swords on 31 October 1944 as Generalmajor and commander of the 72. Infanterie-Division

References

Citations

Bibliography

 
 
 

1897 births
1968 deaths
People from Ortenaukreis
Lieutenant generals of the German Army (Wehrmacht)
German Army personnel of World War I
Recipients of the clasp to the Iron Cross, 1st class
Recipients of the Gold German Cross
Recipients of the Knight's Cross of the Iron Cross with Oak Leaves and Swords
German prisoners of war in World War II held by the United States
University of Mannheim alumni
People from the Grand Duchy of Baden
20th-century Freikorps personnel
Nazi Party politicians
Mayors of places in Baden-Württemberg
German Army generals of World War II